is a Japanese manga artist who writes mainly shōjo manga. Her works are primarily serialized in Margaret magazine, with series published in collected volumes by Shueisha under their Margaret Comics imprint. She contributed to a charity book, along with other authors primarily published in Margaret, to raise funds for the 2011 Japanese earthquake. Her manga series Kami-sama no Ekohiiki will be adapted into a live-action drama series.

Bibliography
 2004: 
 2005–2007: 
 2008: 
 2009: 
 2009–2014: 
 2010: 
 2010: 
 2013–2014: 
2014–2015: Full Dozer
2015: 
2015–2016: 
2017–2018: 
2018–2019: 
2019: 
2019–2020: 
2020:

Notes

References

External links 
 Ayumi Komura's personal website 
 
 Ayumi Komura's biography at Shojo Beat

Living people
Manga artists from Kagoshima Prefecture
Year of birth missing (living people)